Olowe of Ise  (Yoruba: Ọlọ́wẹ̀ of Ìsẹ̀; c. 1938) is considered by Western art historians and collectors to be one of the most important 20th century artists of the Yoruba people of what is today Nigeria.   He was a wood sculptor and master innovator in the African style of design known as oju-ona.

Olowe, originally Olowere, was born in Efon-Alaiye,  a town known as a major cultural centre in Yorubaland, but he lived most of his life in the city of Ise. He was initially employed as a messenger at the court of King Arinjale, the Oba of Ise. It is a matter of dispute whether his artistic career began as an apprenticeship or arose purely from his own natural talent. His fame as a sculptor appears to have begun at Ise under the patronage of Arinjale before spreading throughout eastern Yorubaland. Olowe was summoned to Ilesa, Ikere, Akure, Idanre, Ogbagi and other towns located within a 60-mile radius (96.75 kilometers) to create elaborate household (such as doors and veranda posts), personal and ritual objects for wealthy families.

Olowe's celebrated status as an artist was recorded by his contemporaries in Yoruba oral praise poetry known as oriki. For instance, this example sung by one of his wives was recorded in 1988.

International fame
In 1924, Olowe's art was exhibited overseas for the first time when a door and lintel ensemble from the royal palace at Ikere was selected for the Nigerian Pavilion at the British Empire Exhibition at Wembley, London. This work of art was subsequently acquired by the British Museum.

References

External links and references

Note that Olowe's sculptures were originally painted, but the paint has typically since worn down.
Exhibition at the Smithsonian National Museum of African Art
Assorted sculptures
Veranda post Female Caryatid and Equestrian Figure before 1938
Veranda post Caryatid, 20th century
Veranda post 1910-1914
Veranda post Enthroned King and Senior Wife 1910-1914

Yoruba artists
1870s births
1938 deaths

People from Ekiti State
20th-century Nigerian sculptors
19th-century sculptors
Nigerian woodcarvers
People from the Oyo Empire